Bectric is a locality in the Riverina region of New South Wales, Australia.

References

External links

Towns in New South Wales
Towns in the Riverina